Héctor Campos (born 19 December 1987, in General Roca, Argentina) is an Argentine judoka. He competed at the 2012 Summer Olympics in the -90 kg event.

References

External links
 
 

1987 births
Living people
Argentine male judoka
Olympic judoka of Argentina
Judoka at the 2012 Summer Olympics
People from General Roca
Pan American Games bronze medalists for Argentina
Pan American Games medalists in judo
Judoka at the 2015 Pan American Games
South American Games bronze medalists for Argentina
South American Games medalists in judo
Competitors at the 2018 South American Games
Medalists at the 2015 Pan American Games
20th-century Argentine people
21st-century Argentine people